The Gabbards are a Christian American Southern Gospel group, composed of six family members. Adrian Gabbard, Gary Gabbard, Cathy Gabbard-Saunders, Rob Gabbard, Nathan Gabbard, and Royce Saunders.

History
The group was first formed in 1977 under the name, The Gabbard Brothers. Its name was changed to "The Gabbards" in 1986, when Cathy Gabbard first joined.

The Gabbards have recorded several recordings with the Eddie Crook Co. of Nashville, Tennessee. Most of the recorded songs have been written by The Gabbards. These songs include “On Bended Knees,” written by Rev. Roy Gabbard, which reached Number 30 nationwide on the Singing News Charts. Other Top-50 releases include “He Has the Keys,” “His Coming is Nigh,” and “The Word.”

The Gabbards host a three-day Christian Music event, the Gabbard Homecoming, at the Griffin Center Amphitheater in Falmouth, Kentucky each August. Past performers at the Homecoming, in addition to the Gabbards, include Legacy Five, Ernie Hause & Signature Sound, The Hoppers, Talley Trio, The McKameys, The Perrys, Gold City, Karen Peck & New River and many others.

References

American gospel musical groups
Musical groups established in 1977